Lynn Ann Conway (born January 2, 1938) is an American computer scientist, electrical engineer and transgender activist.

She worked at IBM in the 1960s and invented generalized dynamic instruction handling, a key advance used in out-of-order execution, used by most modern computer processors to improve performance. She initiated the Mead–Conway VLSI chip design revolution in very large scale integrated (VLSI) microchip design. That revolution spread rapidly through the research universities and computing industries during the 1980s, incubating an emerging electronic design automation industry, spawning the modern 'foundry' infrastructure for chip design and production, and triggering a rush of impactful high-tech startups in the 1980s and 1990s.

Early life and education
Conway grew up in White Plains, New York. Conway was shy and experienced gender dysphoria as a child. She became fascinated by astronomy (building a  reflector telescope one summer) and did well in math and science in high school. Conway entered MIT in 1955, earning high grades but ultimately leaving in despair after an attempted gender transition, from male to female in 1957–58, failed due to the medical climate at the time. After working as an electronics technician for several years, Conway resumed education at Columbia University's School of Engineering and Applied Science, earning B.S. and M.S.E.E. degrees in 1962 and 1963.

Early research at IBM
Conway was recruited by IBM Research in Yorktown Heights, New York in 1964, and was soon selected to join the architecture team designing an advanced supercomputer, working alongside John Cocke, Brian Randell, Herbert Schorr, Ed Sussenguth, Fran Allen and other IBM researchers on the Advanced Computing Systems (ACS) project, inventing multiple-issue out-of-order dynamic instruction scheduling while working there. The Computer History Museum has stated that "the ACS machines appears to have been the first superscalar design, a computer architectural paradigm widely exploited in modern high-performance microprocessors."

Gender transition
After learning of the pioneering research of Harry Benjamin in treating transsexual women and realising that gender affirmation surgery was now possible, Conway sought his help and became his patient. After suffering from severe depression from gender dysphoria, Conway contacted Benjamin, who agreed to provide counseling and prescribe hormones. Under Benjamin's care, Conway began her medical gender transition.

While struggling with life in a male role, Conway had been married to a woman and had two children. Under the legal constraints then in place, she was denied access to their children after transitioning.

Although she had hoped to be allowed to transition on the job, IBM fired Conway in 1968 after she revealed her intention to transition. IBM apologized for this in 2020.

Career as computer scientist
Upon completing her transition in 1968, Conway took a new name and identity, and restarted her career in what she called "stealth-mode" as a contract programmer at Computer Applications, Inc. She went on to work at Memorex during 1969–1972 as a digital system designer and computer architect.

Conway joined Xerox PARC in 1973, where she led the "LSI Systems" group under Bert Sutherland. When in PARC, Conway founded the "multiproject wafers" (MPW). This new technology made it possible to pack multiple circuit designs from various sources into one single silicon wafer. Her new invention increased production and decreased costs. Collaborating with Ivan Sutherland and Carver Mead of Caltech on VLSI design methodology, she co-authored Introduction to VLSI Systems, a groundbreaking work that would soon become a standard textbook in chip design, used in nearly 120 universities by 1983. With over 70,000 copies sold, and the new integration of her MPC79/MOSIS innovations, the Mead and Conway revolution became part of VLSI design.

In 1978, Conway served as visiting associate professor of electrical engineering and computer science at MIT, teaching a now famous VLSI design course based on a draft of the Mead–Conway text. The course validated the new design methods and textbook, and established the syllabus and instructor's guidebook used in later courses worldwide.

Among Conway's contributions were the invention of dimensionless, scalable design rules that greatly simplified chip design and design tools, and invention of a new form of internet-based infrastructure for rapid prototyping and short-run fabrication of large numbers of chip designs. The new infrastructure was institutionalized as the Metal Oxide Semiconductor Implementation Service (MOSIS) system in 1981. Two years into its success, Mead and Conway received Electronics magazine's annual award of achievement. Since then, MOSIS has fabricated more than 50,000 circuit designs for commercial firms, government agencies, and research and educational institutions around the world. VLSI researcher Charles Seitz commented that "MOSIS represented the first period since the pioneering work of Eckert and Mauchley on the ENIAC in the late 1940s that universities and small companies had access to state-of-the-art digital technology."

The research methods used to develop the Mead–Conway VLSI design methodology and the MOSIS prototype are documented in a 1981 Xerox report and the Euromicro Journal. The impact of the Mead–Conway work is described in a number of historical overviews of computing. Conway and her colleagues have compiled an online archive of original papers that documents much of that work. The methods also came under ethnographic study in 1980 by PARC anthropologist Lucy Suchman, who published her interviews with Conway in 2021.

In the early 1980s, Conway left Xerox to join DARPA, where she was a key architect of the Defense Department's Strategic Computing Initiative, a research program studying high-performance computing, autonomous systems technology, and intelligent weapons technology.

In a USA Today article about Conway's joining DARPA, Mark Stefik, a Xerox scientist who worked with her, said "Lynn would like to live five lives in the course of one life" and that she's "charismatic and very energetic". Douglas Fairbairn, a former Xerox associate, said "She figures out a way so that everybody wins."

Conway joined the University of Michigan in 1985 as professor of electrical engineering and computer science, and associate dean of engineering. There she worked on "visual communications and control probing for basic system and user-interface concepts as applicable to hybridized internet/broadband-cable communications". She retired from active teaching and research in 1998, as professor emerita at Michigan.

Legacy
As sociologist Thomas Streeter discusses in The Net Effect: "By taking this job, Conway was demonstrating that she was no antiwar liberal. (In response to critics, she has said, 'if you have to fight, and sometimes you must in order to deal with bad people, history tells us that it really helps to have the best weapons available)". But Conway carried a sense of computers as tools for horizontal communications that she had absorbed at PARC right into DARPA – at one of the hottest moments of the cold war."

In the fall of 2012, the IEEE published a special issue of the IEEE Solid-State Circuits Magazine devoted to Lynn Conway's career, including a career memoir by Conway and peer commentaries by Chuck House, former Director of Engineering at HP, Carlo Séquin, Professor of EECS at U.C. Berkeley, and Ken Shepard, of Columbia University. Subsequently the scope of Conway's contributions gained wider retrospective attention. "Since I didn't #LookLikeanEngineer, few people caught on to what I was really doing back in the 70s and 80s," says Conway.

"Clearly a new paradigm had emerged ... Importantly, imaginative support in terms of infrastructure and idea dissemination proved as valuable as the concepts, tools, and chips. The "electronic book" and the "foundry" were both prescient and necessary, providing momentum and proof-points." James F. "Jim" Gibbons, former dean of engineering at Stanford University, further states that Lynn Conway, from his perspective, "...was the singular force behind the entire 'foundry' development that emerged." Kenneth Shepard, Professor of Biomedical and Electrical Engineering at Columbia University, stated that "Lynn's amazing story of accomplishment and personal triumph in the face of personal adversity and overt discrimination should serve as an inspiration to all young engineers."

In 2020, NAE President John L. Anderson stated that "Lynn Conway is not only a revolutionary pioneer in the design of VLSI systems ... But just as important, Lynn has been very brave in telling her own story, and her perseverance has been a reminder to society that it should not be blind to the innovations of women, people of color, or others who don't fit long outdated – but unfortunately, persistent – perceptions of what an engineer looks like."

Transgender activism
When nearing retirement, Conway learned that the story of her early work at IBM might soon be revealed through the investigations of Mark Smotherman that were being prepared for a 2001 publication. She began quietly coming out in 1999 to friends and colleagues about her past gender transition, using her personal website to tell the story in her own words. Her story was then more widely reported in 2000 in profiles in Scientific American and the Los Angeles Times. In a later Forbes interview, Conway commented "From the 1970s to 1999 I was recognized as breaking the gender barrier in the computer science field as a woman, but in 2000 it became the transgender barrier I was breaking."

After going public with her story, she began work in transgender activism, intending to "illuminate and normalize the issues of gender identity and the processes of gender transition". She has worked to protect and expand the rights of transgender people. She has provided direct and indirect assistance to numerous other transgender women going through transition and maintains a website providing medical resources and emotional advice. Parts have been translated into most of the world's major languages. She maintained a listing of many successful post-transition transgender people, to, in her words "provide role models for individuals who are facing gender transition". Her website also provided news related to transgender issues and information on sex reassignment surgery for transsexual women, facial feminization surgery, academic inquiries into the prevalence of transsexualism and transgender and transsexual issues in general.

She has also advocated for equal opportunities and employment protections for transgender people in high-technology industry, and for elimination of the pathologization of transgender people by the psychiatric community.

Conway has been a critic of the Blanchard, Bailey, and Lawrence theory of male-to-female transsexualism that all trans women are motivated either by feminine homosexuality or autogynephilia. She was also a key person in the campaign against J. Michael Bailey's book about the theory, The Man Who Would Be Queen. American transgender rights activist Andrea James, Conway and University of Chicago economics professor Dierdre McCloskey wrote letters to Northwestern University, accusing Bailey of "conducting intimate research observations on human subjects without telling them that they were objects of the study." American bioethicist Alice Dreger in her book Galilieo's Middle Finger criticized Conway for filing a lawsuit against Bailey which had "no legal basis", referring to her allegation that Bailey lacked a license as a clinical psychologist when he wrote letters in support of a young trans woman seeking to transition. According to Dreger, as Bailey did not receive compensation for his services, he would not have needed a license in Illinois, and was "completely forthright in his letters supporting the women, both about the fact that he had only had brief conversations with them (as opposed to having provided them with extensive counseling) and about his own qualifications and expertise... [and] even attached copies of his CV." As Dreger argues, "presumably all this was why [Illinois] never bothered to pursue the charge." In response, Conway argued that Dreger "deflects attention away from Bailey's book and the massive trans community protest, and caricatures the entire controversy as nothing more than a vicious effort by three rather witch-like women to 'ruin the life' of a brilliant scientist. In doing so, she stoops to new lows as a dirty-trickster by misquoting sources, exploiting sleazy innuendos and fabricating entire story-episodes in order to defame the three women."

Conway was a cast member in the first all-transgender performance of The Vagina Monologues in Los Angeles in 2004, and appeared in a LOGO-Channel documentary film about that event entitled Beautiful Daughters.

In 2009, Conway was named one of the "Stonewall 40 trans heroes" on the 40th anniversary of the Stonewall riots by the International Court System, one of the oldest and largest predominantly gay organizations in the world, and the National Gay and Lesbian Task Force.

In 2013, with support from many thought-leaders in high-technology, Conway and her colleague Leandra Vicci of the University of North Carolina at Chapel Hill successfully lobbied the board of directors of the Institute of Electrical and Electronics Engineers (IEEE) for transgender inclusion in the IEEE's Code of Ethics. That Code, known within the profession as much as a code of honor as one of ethics, became fully LGBT inclusive in January 2014, thus impacting the world's largest engineering professional society, with 425,000 members in 160 countries. In 2014, Time Magazine named Lynn as one of "21 Transgender People Who Influenced American Culture". In 2015 she was selected for inclusion in "The Trans100".

Personal life
In 1987, Conway met her husband Charles "Charlie" Rogers, a professional engineer who shares her interest in the outdoors, including whitewater canoeing and motocross racing. On August 13, 2002, they were married. In 2014, the University of Michigan's The Michigan Engineer alumni magazine documented the connections between Conway's engineering explorations and the adventures in her personal life.

Awards and honors
Conway has received a number of awards and distinctions:
 Electronics 1981 Award for Achievement, with Carver Mead
 Harold Pender Award of the Moore School, University of Pennsylvania, with Carver Mead, 1984
 IEEE EAB Major Educational Innovation Award, 1984
 Fellow of the IEEE, 1985, "for contributions to VLSI technology"
 John Price Wetherill Medal of the Franklin Institute, with Carver Mead, 1985
 Secretary of Defense Meritorious Civilian Service Award, May 1985
 Member of the National Academy of Engineering, 1989
 National Achievement Award, Society of Women Engineers, 1990
 Presidential Appointment to the United States Air Force Academy Board of Visitors, 1996
 Honorary Doctorate, Trinity College, 1998
 Electronic Design Hall of Fame, 2002
 Engineer of the Year, National Organization of Gay and Lesbian Scientists and Technical Professionals, 2005
 Named one of the "Stonewall 40 trans heroes" by the Imperial Court System and the National LGBTQ Task Force, 2009.
 Computer Pioneer Award, IEEE Computer Society, 2009
 Member of the Corporation, Emerita, The Charles Stark Draper Laboratory, 1993–2010
 Fellow Award, Computer History Museum, 2014, "For her work in developing and disseminating new methods of integrated circuit design."
 Honorary Doctorate, Illinois Institute of Technology, 2014
 Steinmetz Memorial Lecture, (Invitational), IEEE/Union College, 2015.
 IEEE/RSE James Clerk Maxwell Medal, 2015
 Magill Lecture in Science, Technology and the Arts (Invited), Columbia University, 2016
 Honorary Doctorate, University of Victoria, 2016
 Fellow Award, American Association for the Advancement of Science (AAAS), 2016
 Honorary Doctorate and Commencement Address, University of Michigan, Ann Arbor, 2018
Pioneer in Tech Award, National Center for Women in Technology (NCWIT), 2019
Lifetime Achievement Award, IBM Corporation, 2020
Selected for Induction into the National Inventors Hall of Fame (NIHF), 2023

IBM's apology
In 2020, 52 years after IBM fired her for being transgender, IBM officially and publicly apologized to Conway; IBM held a public event "Tech Trailblazer and Transgender Pioneer Lynn Conway in conversation with Diane Gherson" (IBM's senior VP of HR); IBM's Director of Research Dario Gil said "Lynn was recently awarded the rare IBM Lifetime Achievement Award, given to individuals who have changed the world through technology inventions. Lynn's extraordinary technical achievements helped define the modern computing industry. She paved the way for how we design and make computing chips today – and forever changed microelectronics, devices, and people's lives."

Selected works

Patents

References

Further reading

External links

1938 births
Living people
20th-century American inventors
American computer scientists
American women academics
American women computer scientists
Columbia School of Engineering and Applied Science alumni
Computer hardware engineers
IBM employees
LGBT mathematicians
LGBT people from Michigan
American LGBT scientists
Massachusetts Institute of Technology alumni
People from Ann Arbor, Michigan
People from White Plains, New York
Scientists at PARC (company)
Scientists from New York (state)
Transgender academics
Transgender rights activists
Transgender scientists
Transgender women
University of Michigan faculty
Women inventors